The Palau Municipal d'Esports Son Moix is a futsal arena in Palma, Spain.  It is currently used for the basketball matches of Palma Air Europa and the futsal matches of AE Palma Futsal. The arena holds 3.920 spectators.

History

In October 2007 a heavy storm partially destroyed the arena. The renovation works lasted seven years and Son Moix was re-opened on 18 January 2014.

References

External links 
Son Moix at Town Hall of Palma website

Indoor arenas in Spain
Buildings and structures in Palma de Mallorca
Sport in Mallorca
Sports venues in the Balearic Islands